Cherak-e Pain (also Romanized as Cherāk-e Pā’īn; also known as Shahrāndak and Cherāk) is a village in Bondar Rural District, Senderk District, Minab County, Hormozgan Province, Iran. At the 2006 census, its population was 113, in 20 families.

References 

Populated places in Minab County